Magnetogram may refer to:
 Solar magnetogram, a pictorial representation of the spatial variations in strength of the solar magnetic field produced by a solar magnetograph
 Survey magnetogram, a pictorial representation of the time-variation in the geomagnetic field produced by a survey magnetograph

Magnetic devices